Magisk is free and open-source software for the rooting of Android devices, developed by John Wu. Magisk supports devices running Android 5.0+.

Overview 
Magisk is a free and open-source software that enables users to gain root access to their Android devices. With Magisk, users can install various modifications and customizations, making it a popular choice for Android enthusiasts. Additionally, Magisk comes with a built-in app called Magisk, which allows users to manage root permissions and install various modules.

Magisk is systemless approach and modular design, it offers a safe and easy way to root a device and add new features and functionality.

History 

Magisk started out as a small project created by John Wu, it has now grown to more than 252 contributors. In version 21, support for Android 11 was added. In version 22, support for the Samsung Galaxy S21 was added. In version 23, support for Android 5 and earlier was removed.

The original developer John Wu started working for the Android security team in 2021. In 2021, the MagiskHide feature of Magisk was discontinued by the original developer John Wu. Arnoud Wokke from Tweakers argued that there is a high chance this feature will be developed by a third party developer as a Magisk module.

Magisk 25.2 is the latest version. It supports devices running higher than Android 5.0, including the recently released Android 13.

See also 

 Bootloader unlocking
 SuperSU

References

External links 
 Magisk GitHub repository
 Magisk Documentation
 Magisk Direct Files Sources

Android (operating system)